Lena Johansson (born 1969) is a Swedish politician and member of the Riksdag, the national legislature. A member of the Social Democratic Party, she has represented Västmanland County since September 2012. She had previously been a member of the municipal council in Köping Municipality.

References

1970 births
Living people
Members of the Riksdag 2022–2026
Members of the Riksdag from the Social Democrats
People from Köping Municipality
Women members of the Riksdag
21st-century Swedish women politicians